Macari may refer to:

Places
 Macari, Peru, capital of Macari District, in the province Melgar in Peru
 Macari, Frazione of San Vito lo Capo in Sicily, Italy

People with the surname
 Anne Marie Macari (born 1955), American poet
 Chris Macari (born 1980), French music video director and producer
 Lou Macari (born 1949), Scottish footballer and football manager
 Mike Macari (born 1973), Scottish footballer
 Paul Macari (born 1976), Scottish footballer

See also
 Makkari (disambiguation)